Sport Republic is a London based sports investment firm founded by Rasmus Ankersen and Henrik Kraft and financed by lead investor Dragan Šolak. The firm currently holds an 80% stake in the Premier League club Southampton.

On 19 August 2022, Sport Republic acquired a 70% stake in Turkish club Göztepe, becoming the first foreign investor to buy a club in the Turkish football industry.

Background 
Sport Republic was set up by Rasmus Ankersen, who was previously director of football at Brentford, and Henrik Kraft, formerly a partner at private equity firm KKR. Dragan Šolak was told about the plans to obtain stakes in football clubs, with Šolak agreeing and becoming a lead investor.

United Group, the European media company founded by Šolak, had previously held the rights to screen Premier League matches in the Balkans but lost out on the latest rights to screen Premier League matches to Telekom Srbija. Šolak has insisted that his decision to become a lead investor, and buy Southampton, was unconnected to losing the Premier League rights.

Sport Republic owned clubs

Southampton F.C. 
On 4 January 2022, it was announced that Sport Republic had bought Chinese businessman Gao Jisheng’s 80% stake in Southampton. Despite buying Southampton, Sport Republic was keen to create a multi-club model similar to what City Football Group has achieved but to a smaller scale. Southampton chief executive Martin Semmens said that the new ownership would allow the club to be more flexible in the transfer market but insisted a sensible, cautious approach will help the club in the long term.

Sport Republic’s first summer transfer window during the 2022–23 season saw a number of new arrivals for Southampton, with the transfers putting faith in youth. The window saw the arrivals of Gavin Bazunu, Mateusz Lis, Armel Bella-Kotchap, Roméo Lavia, Joe Aribo, Sékou Mara, Duje Ćaleta-Car, Samuel Edozie and Juan Larios on permanent transfers, whilst Ainsley Maitland-Niles joined on loan.

The manager at the time, Ralph Hasenhüttl, called their efforts in the window 'phenomenal'.

On 7 November 2022, Southampton announced it had parted company with Ralph Hasenhüttl. At the time Southampton were in the Premier League relegation zone with 12 points after 14 games. This was Sport Republic's first managerial sacking.

On 10 November 2022, Sport Republic appointed Nathan Jones as Southampton's new manager, joining from Luton Town. Jones's appointment led to widespread disapproval from the fanbase and calls to sack him after just four games, after Jones lost all four.

The January window saw Sport Republic buying five players in an attempt to lift the club off the bottom of the table. A club record fee was paid for winger Kamaldeen Sulemana. Mislav Oršić, Carlos Alcaraz, James Bree, and striker Paul Onuachu also joined the club.

On 12 February 2023, Nathan Jones was sacked as Southampton manager after just 95 days in charge.

Göztepe S.K. 
On 19 August 2022, it was announced that Sport Republic brought a 70% stake in Göztepe. Ankersen, who is director at Southampton, was appointed chairman of the club.

Other business ventures 
Sport Republic have also acquired stakes in the football youth development app Tonsser and sport streaming site Sport Buff.

References 

Companies based in London
Southampton F.C.
Göztepe A.Ş.